Free Agent: A Spaced Odyssey is the fifth solo album by former Parliament-Funkadelic keyboardist Bernie Worrell. The album was released by Polystar Records in Japan in 1997. The album features guest musicians Buckethead, Umar Bin Hassan  and Bill Laswell. Free Agent has never been distributed by any major or independent record label outside Japan.

Track listing

"Hope Is Here" (Bernie Worrell)
"AfroFuturism (Phased One)" (Bernie Worrell, Bill Laswell)
"In Pursuit" (Bernie Worrell, Dominic Kanza)
"WOO Awakens, The Wizard Cometh" (Bernie Worrell)
"Re-Enter Black Light (Entersection)" (Bernie Worrell, Jean Pierre Sluys)
"Warriors Off to WOO" (Bernie Worrell)

Personnel

Hamid Drake - Drums, Tabla, Percussion
Aïyb Dieng - Chatan, Congas, Percussion, Bells
Dominic Kanza - Guitar
Buckethead - Guitar
Bill Laswell - Bass, Bells
Jean Pierre Sluys - Bass, Guitar, Beats, Sound EFX

Bernie Worrell albums
1997 albums
Albums produced by Bill Laswell